140th may refer to:

140th (4th London) Brigade, infantry brigade formation of the British Army's Territorial Army that had its origins in a South London Brigade
140th Aeromedical Transport Squadron, unit of the Pennsylvania Air National Guard stationed at Harrisburg International Airport, Middletown, Pennsylvania
140th Battalion (St. John's Tigers), CEF, unit in the Canadian Expeditionary Force during the First World War
140th Belmont Stakes or 2008 Belmont Stakes, the 140th running of the Belmont Stakes
140th Delaware General Assembly, meeting of the legislative branch of the state government, consisting of the Delaware Senate and the Delaware House of Representatives
140th Division (Imperial Japanese Army) (第140師団, Dai-hyakuyonju Shidan
140th Georgia General Assembly succeeded the 139th and served as the precedent for the 141st General Assembly in 1991
140th Illinois Volunteer Infantry Regiment, infantry regiment that served in the Union Army during the American Civil War
140th Indiana Infantry Regiment served in the Union Army between October 24, 1864, and July 11, 1865, during the American Civil War
140th meridian east, line of longitude that extends from the North Pole across Asia, the Pacific Ocean, Australasia, and Antarctica to the South Pole
140th meridian west, line of longitude that extends from the North Pole across North America, the Pacific Ocean, the Southern Ocean, and Antarctica to the South Pole
140th Military Intelligence Battalion (United States) of the United States Army Reserve
140th New York State Legislature met from January 3 to October 2, 1917, during the third year of Charles S. Whitman's governorship, in Albany
140th New York Volunteer Infantry Regiment, United States Federal military Regiment mustered 1862 for service in the American Civil War
140th Ohio Infantry, infantry regiment in the Union Army during the American Civil War
140th Operations Group, unit of the Colorado Air National Guard, stationed at Buckley Space Force Base, Aurora, Colorado
140th Pennsylvania Infantry, Union Army regiment in the American Civil War, serving in the Eastern Theater
140th pope or Pope John XVII (died 1003), Pope for about seven months from 16 May to 6 November 1003
140th Rifle Division (Soviet Union), Red Army rifle division of the Great Patriotic War
140th Signal Battalion (United States), field artillery battalion of the Army National Guard
140th Street (IRT Ninth Avenue Line), station on the demolished IRT Ninth Avenue Line
140th Street (MVTA station), bus rapid transit station along Cedar Avenue in Apple Valley, Minnesota
140th Wing, unit of the Colorado Air National Guard, stationed at Buckley Space Force Base, Aurora, Colorado
140th Year Anniversary Celebration of the Emancipation Proclamation, national campaign to honor, celebrate, and commemorate January 1, 2003
Connecticut's 140th assembly district, one of 151 Connecticut House of Representatives districts
Pennsylvania's 140th Representative District, located in Bucks County

See also
140 (disambiguation)